Alexander Mather (by 1517 – 12 September 1558), of Norwich, Norfolk, was an English politician.

He was a Member of Parliament (MP) for Norwich from 1553 to 1554.

References

1558 deaths
Politicians from Norwich
Year of birth uncertain
English MPs 1553 (Edward VI)
English MPs 1554–1555